The 2005–06 SK Rapid Wien season is the 108th season in club history.

Squad statistics

Goal scorers

Fixtures and results

Bundesliga

League table

Cup

Champions League

Qualification rounds

Group stage

References

2005-06 Rapid Wien Season
Austrian football clubs 2005–06 season